Shenyang Dongjin Football Club was a Chinese football club based in Shenyang, Liaoning and their home stadium is the Shenyang Urban Construction University Stadium that has a seating capacity of 12,000.

History
Founded as Jinan Fulu Football Club in Jinan on 11 June 1996, they were renamed Jinan Sanyun after their first ever China League Two season that year. In 1999, they were renamed again as Jining Dranix Football Club (Simplified Chinese: 济宁九巨龙足球俱乐部) after moving to Jining. They stayed there until 2004. In 2005, they moved to Cixi and were renamed Ningbo Cixi Chipard Football Club (Simplified Chinese: 宁波慈溪中豹足球俱乐部). There, they played at Ningbo Cixi Stadium. They didn't compete in the 2007 season and moved to Shenyang at the start of the 2008 China League Two season, renaming themselves again as Shenyang Dongjin.

In February 2012, Shenyang Dongjin announced they would move to Hohhot for 2012 and 2013 league season, during which they would be renamed as Hohhot Dongjin. The club finished in the bottom of the league and was relegated to League Two.

On 11 July 2018, the Chinese Football Association announced that Shenyang Dongjin failed to register for the rest of the season due to wage arrears, which marks the end of the club and its history which spans more than two decades.

Name history
 1996 Jinan Fulu 济南富禄
 1997–1999 Jinan Sanyun 济南三运
 1999–2004 Jining Dranix 济宁九巨龙
 2005–2006 Ningbo Cixi Chipard 宁波慈溪中豹
 2007–2011 Shenyang Dongjin 沈阳东进
 2012–2013 Hohhot Dongjin 呼和浩特东进
 2013–2018 Shenyang Dongjin 沈阳东进

Managerial history
Shenyang Dongjin
  Duan Xin (2008–2009)
  Yu Ming (2010–2011)
  Chen Bo (2012)
  Yang Yumin (Caretaker) (2012)
  Zhao Faqing (2013)
  Li Wei (2014–2015)
  Lee Woo-hyung (2016–2017)
  Wang Gang (2017)
  Marjan Živković(2018)

Club honours
 China League Two (Third Tier League)
 Winners (1): 2008

Results
All-time League Rankings

As of the end of 2018 season.

The club did not compete in 2007 season.
 In group stage.
 Zhaoqing Hengtai gave up to turn professional and remained at the amateur league, so Shenyang Dongjin could stay at third level.

Key
 Pld = Played
 W = Games won
 D = Games drawn
 L = Games lost
 F = Goals for
 A = Goals against
 Pts = Points
 Pos = Final position

 DNQ = Did not qualify
 DNE = Did not enter
 NH = Not Held
 – = Does Not Exist
 R1 = Round 1
 R2 = Round 2
 R3 = Round 3
 R4 = Round 4

 F = Final
 SF = Semi-finals
 QF = Quarter-finals
 R16 = Round of 16
 Group = Group stage
 GS2 = Second Group stage
 QR1 = First Qualifying Round
 QR2 = Second Qualifying Round
 QR3 = Third Qualifying Round

References

External links
Profile at Sina.com

Football clubs in China
Association football clubs established in 1996
1996 establishments in China
Association football clubs disestablished in 2018
2018 disestablishments in China
Sport in Shenyang
Defunct football clubs in China
Football clubs in Liaoning